Dragan Aleksić (born 1 May 1970), also credited as Dragan Alekszics in Hungary, is a Serbian professional basketball coach and former player. He currently serves as the head coach for PVSK-Veolia of the Hungarian League.

Playing career 
Aleksić started his professional career in Belgrade-based team Crvena zvezda. In 1991, he joined Spartak Subotica. In 1998, he joined Radnički Belgrade for the 1998–99 season. Aleksić played the 1999–2000 season in Israel, for Haifa. After the season in Israel, Aleksić had stints in Slovakia (Slovakofarma Pezinok) and Russia (Lokomotiv Mineralnye Vody).

In 2001, Aleksić joined Tuzla-based Sloboda Dita of the ABA League and the Bosnia and Herzegovina Championship. On December 12, 2001, he set his ABA League career-high in points when he scored 41 points in a 92–86 road win over Zadar. He also recorded 7 rebounds, 7 assists, and 7 steals. He shot 7/17 from two, 5/8 from three, shooting at 48.0% from the field. He also shot 12/17 from the free-throw line. On February 2, 2002, Aleksić set his ABA League career-high in assists when he dished 14 assists in a 90-79 home win over Kvarner Novi Resort. He also recorded 13 points, 3 rebounds, and 2 steals.

After one season in Tuzla, Aleksić had more stints in Bosnia (Banjalučka pivara and Bosna ASA) and Serbia & Montenegro (Atlas). In November 2004, he signed for Szolnoki Olaj of the Hungarian League. He left Szolnoki after the end of the season.

Coaching career 
In January 2017, Aleksić was named a head coach of the Hungarian team Soproni.

On 14 July 2017, Aleksić signed for Szolnoki Olaj.

Administrative career 
In 2016, Aleksić became the technical director for SCM U Craiova of the Romanian League. In January 2017, he parted ways with SCM U Craiova.

Career achievements and awards 
As player
 Hungarian Cup winner: 1 (with PVSK-Veolia: 2008–09)

As coach
 Hungarian League champion: 3 (with Szolnoki Olaj: 2013–14, 2014–15, 2017–18)
 Hungarian Cup winner: 4 (with Szolnoki Olaj: 2013–14, 2014–15, 2017–18, 2018–19)

References

External links
 Coach Profile at eurobasket.com
 Player Profile at eurobasket.com
 Player Profile at proballers.com
 Player Profile at basketball-reference.com
 Player Profile at realgm.com
 Player Profile at euroleague.net

1970 births
Living people
KK Beopetrol/Atlas Beograd players
KK Borac Banja Luka players
KK Bosna Royal players
KK Crvena zvezda players
KK Sloboda Tuzla players
KK Spartak Subotica players
Maccabi Haifa B.C. players
Serbian basketball executives and administrators
Serbian expatriate basketball people in Bosnia and Herzegovina
Serbian expatriate basketball people in Israel
Serbian expatriate basketball people in Hungary
Serbian expatriate basketball people in Slovakia
Serbian expatriate basketball people in Romania
Serbian expatriate basketball people in Russia
Serbian men's basketball coaches
Serbian men's basketball players
Shooting guards
Szolnoki Olaj KK players
PBC Lokomotiv-Kuban players
Sportspeople from Podujevo
PVSK Panthers players
BKK Radnički players
Yugoslav men's basketball players
Kosovo Serbs